James E. Buskey (born April 10, 1937) is an American politician. He was a member of the Alabama House of Representatives from the 99th District, serving from 1976 to 2018. He is a member of the Democratic party.

In 1997, Buskey ran in the special election to succeed Michael Figures in the Alabama Senate. He lost to Vivian Davis Figures.

References

Living people
Democratic Party members of the Alabama House of Representatives
1937 births
21st-century American politicians
African-American state legislators in Alabama
20th-century American politicians
20th-century African-American politicians
African-American men in politics
21st-century African-American politicians